Boris A. Kordemsky (23 May 1907 – 29 March 1999) was a Russian mathematician and educator.  He is best known for his popular science books and mathematical puzzles.  He is the author of over 70 books and popular mathematics articles.

Kordemsky was born in Kiknur, Vyatka Governorate, Russian Empire.  He received his Ph.D. in education in 1956 and taught mathematics at several Moscow colleges.

References 
 Age of Puzzles Biography, by  Will Shortz and Serhiy Grabarchuk 
 Mini Biography, in Russian. 
 Kordemsky's articles in Kvant magazine (in Russian)
 The Moscow Puzzles: 359 Mathematical Recreations By: Boris A. Kordemsky, Charles Scribner's Sons, New York, 1972

1907 births
1999 deaths
Puzzle designers
Recreational mathematicians
Mathematics popularizers
Russian science writers
Soviet non-fiction writers
Soviet male writers
20th-century Russian male writers
20th-century  Russian mathematicians
Male non-fiction writers
Soviet mathematicians